The Anderson Carriage Manufacturing Company in Anderson, Indiana, began building automobiles in 1907, and continued until 1910.  The cars were known as "Anderson".

References

External links

Defunct companies based in Indiana
Defunct motor vehicle manufacturers of the United States
Historic American Engineering Record in Indiana
Motor vehicle manufacturers based in Indiana
1907 establishments in Indiana
Anderson, Indiana